Glycosmis is a genus of flowering plants in the citrus family, Rutaceae and tribe  Clauseneae. It is in the subfamily Aurantioideae, which also includes genus Citrus. It is a genus of the subtribe Clauseninae, which are known technically as the remote citroid fruit trees.

The distribution of the genus includes Southeast Asia and Australia.

Description
Plants of the genus are shrubs and small trees. New growth is coated densely in rusty hairs. The leaves are simple blades or are divided into narrow leaflets, sometimes pinnately. The small flowers have five white petals and are borne in compound inflorescences. The fruit is a juicy or dry berry. Some species can be variable in appearance.

Diversity
The genus Glycosmis is not well understood and many named species have not been adequately described. Today there are about 35 to 50 species included in the genus.

Species include:
Glycosmis aglaioides R.H.Miao
Glycosmis albicarpa
Glycosmis angustifolia Lindl. ex Wight & Arn.
Glycosmis borana V.Naray. ex Tanaka
Glycosmis chlorosperma (Blume) Spreng.
Glycosmis collina B.C.Stone
Glycosmis craibii Tanaka
Glycosmis crassifolia Ridl.
Glycosmis cyanocarpa (Blume) Spreng.
Glycosmis cymosa (Kurz) V.Naray.
 Glycosmis decipiens
Glycosmis dinhensis
Glycosmis elongata
Glycosmis erythrocarpa — red-tangerine
Glycosmis esquirolii
Glycosmis gracilis
Glycosmis greenei
Glycosmis longipes
 Glycosmis longisepala
Glycosmis lucida
Glycosmis macrantha
Glycosmis macrocarpa
Glycosmis macrophylla
Glycosmis mansiana
Glycosmis mauritiana
Glycosmis montana
 Glycosmis monticola (syn. G. chlorosperma)
Glycosmis oligantha
Glycosmis ovoidea
Glycosmis parkinsonii
Glycosmis parva
Glycosmis parviflora — Chinese glycosmis
 Glycosmis pentaphylla — orangeberry, gin berry
 Glycosmis perakensis
Glycosmis petelotii
Glycosmis pierrei
Glycosmis pilosa
Glycosmis pseudoracemosa
Glycosmis pseudosapindoides
Glycosmis puberula
Glycosmis singuliflora
Glycosmis stenura
Glycosmis subopposita
Glycosmis sumatrana
Glycosmis superba
Glycosmis tetracronia
 Glycosmis tomentella
Glycosmis trichanthera
 Glycosmis trifoliata — pink-fruit glycosmis
Glycosmis xizangensis

References

External links

 
Aurantioideae genera
Taxonomy articles created by Polbot